Sören Schlegel (born 28 December 1960) is a German former sprinter. He competed in the men's 100 metres at the 1980 Summer Olympics representing East Germany.

References

External links
 

1960 births
Living people
Athletes (track and field) at the 1980 Summer Olympics
German male sprinters
Olympic athletes of East Germany
Place of birth missing (living people)